Alexander Uhlmann (born 26 February 1981) better known as Alex Uhlmann, is a singer-songwriter and guitarist, who has been the lead vocalist of the band Planet Funk since 2010. Parallel to working with Planet Funk, Alex started his career as a solo artist in 2017 and has also been working with DJ David Morales. Other than that Alex owns a Pizzeria in Berlin (Futura) and has been the musical Director of the Voice of Italy since 2019.

Biography

Childhood and his entry into Friday Night Hero 
Born in Luxembourg of German parents, Uhlmann in his adolescence was a promising tennis player, representing his country in many international tournaments.

He started playing piano at a young age but later migrated to the guitar. Being self-taught he thought of it being an advantage rather than a burden especially in terms of songwriting:

Uhlmann quickly moved to the UK in order to explore the vast British musical landscape, and formed the indie rock band‚ Friday Night Hero, with whom he released the album Tourist in Your Own Town on 2 October 2009 on Capitol East Records. The band performed in several European countries and were nominated for the Indie award as "best UK live act" in 2008.

In his time in the UK Uhlmann also obtained a master's degree in international relations at the University of Sussex in Brighton.

With Planet Funk and the international success 

In 2010 Uhlmann left Friday Night Hero to join Planet Funk, the famous international band, with whom he began a lively period of production. That is how he rose to international fame.

On 22 September 2011 the album The Great Shake was released (the fourth Planet Funk studio album and the first with Uhlmann on vocals and guitar), including hit singles such as "Another Sunrise" (used as the soundtrack for the Hyundai i20 Sound Edition TV advertisement), and "Ora il mondo è perfetto", with Giuliano Sangiorgi, frontman of the Italian band Negramaro’.

A month later Planet Funk were asked to record a cover of Nancy Sinatra's classic "These Boots Are Made for Walkin'", as the soundtrack for the movie La kryptonite nella borsa by Ivan Cotroneo. The song rapidly topped the Italian dance charts and was awarded gold status in Italy for over 15.000 legal downloads. Later on, the single was included in the new version of the album, entitled The Great Shake + 2. Moreover it was used for the italian Wind tv advertisement campaign in 2011/2012.

Since May 2011, Planet Funk played over a hundred live concerts as part of "The Great Shake Tour" throughout Europe, including shows such as the Formula One Gran Prix in Monza with Jamiroquai, the Olympic stadium in Rome with Tiesto and at the MTV Days in Turin in 2011.

In September 2012 Uhlmann was chosen as protagonist for the Italian Reebok campaign for which he shot a TV spot in Paris. Together with Planet Funk he also designed a Reebok shoe, the "PF 1999", that will be released in March 2013.

In the same year, during the MTV Digital Days in Turin, Uhlmann performed the "Planet Funk DJ Set" for the first time alongside Alex Neri and a successful tour of Italy followed, which included a set at the MTV European Music Awards after party in Milan in October 2015.

On 13 October 2015 Planet Funk released their single "We People", again with Uhlmann on vocals, chosen by Save The Children as soundtrack for their "Everyone" campaign, dedicating all profits to their fight against child mortality in the world.

"We People" will be included in the upcoming 2017 album, which Planet Funk recorded between London and Rome. The album also sees the comeback of two memorable singers of the band: Dan Black and Sally Doherty, who also feature in the "Recall Tour", that Planet Funk started in November 2016, promoting the revival of the "collective nature" of Planet Funk:

Thanks to his charisma, the success of The Great Shake album and tours as well as being able to interpret even Planet Funk's oldest songs with the necessary credibility, Uhlmann succeeded in establishing himself since 2010 as an integral part of the Planet Funk collective.

Solo career 

Parallel to his activity in Planet Funk, Uhlmann started producing and writing for other artists as well as collaborating on a project created by Bluvertigo's drummer, Sergio Carnevale, the "Superband" which unites members of some of the most important Italian bands for events and special performances. With the "superband" (featuring Carnevale, Uhlmann, Ligabue's memorable guitarist, Federico Poggipollini and Marco Garrincha Castellani of Le Vibrazioni) Uhlmann took part in the documentary "Vinyl Talk", which was broadcast on Sky Italia in February 2016. A little later in the same year Uhlmann and the "Superband" appeared for a guest performance in the final episode of the talent show "Top DJ", aired on Mediaset on 4 July 2016.

In 2017 Uhlmann has started a solo career. He released a single entitled "Anyway", 24 January 2017, in collaboration with one of the most important DJs of Central America, Francis Davila, from Guatemala:

On 14 July 2017 Uhlmann released "The Ocean ft. Edo", through Sony Music.

Later on that year Uhlmann began writing with the US DJ David Morales. The collaboration resulted in a first single entitled "Back home" which was released on 6 April 2018 to critical success, being also played on BBC radio 1 by Danny Howard.

During the same time Uhlmann was chosen by IBM Italy to experiment with artificial Intelligence in songwriting. The result was the lyrics to his second solo single 'Butterfly', released on 15 June 2018 (Universal). With the help of IBM's Watson software, Uhlmann was provided with data retrieved from social media that inspired him to write lyrics about family values:

On 7 June Uhlmann was awarded the 'Thinker Award for Creativity' for his work with IBM's Watson software.

In the summer of 2018 Uhlmann started live activity with his solo project as well as several dates alongside David Morales throughout Europe.

His first gig as a solo artist was the opening for Negramaro at the Olympic stadium in Rome on 30 June.

2019 started for Alex with a DJ set at the San Siro stadium in Milan for AC Milan's Serie A home match against SSC Napoli. (26 Jan).
On 19 April the historical New York label "Nervous Records" released the second single of Alex's ongoing collaboration with David Morales: "One Race" was remixed by Spanish house duo Chus & Ceballos and chosen by Hector Romero for his "Weaving Genres vol. 2" (Nervous Records).

Alex was then appointed "Artistic and Musical director" for The Voice of Italy which aired on Rai 2 from 23 April until 4 June and was presented by Simona Ventura.
In November 2020 Alex is confirmed as "Musical Director" for the Voice of Italy senior", aired on Rai 1 and presented by Antonella Clerici.

In February 2021 he released his New Single "Paris or Rome" in Europe.
With this first single Uhlmann has already left a few marks on German and Italian media. In addition to various radio and TV appearances, the single was honored with an article as well as an editors' choice mention in Rolling Stone Magazine. Furthermore, the song made it straight into the playlists of MTV Germany and MTV Italia.

The second single „Never be the same“ is released on 21 May 2021 and hit the radio stations all over the world.
in 2022 the Remix of his Single "Only For A Minute" by Sterio hit again the radios and reached the Dance Charts in Germany (Top 25), Austria (Top 30) and Switzerland.
The song is yet another promising sneak peek into the upcoming EP „Home“, which is scheduled to drop in Summer 2023.

Discography

Friday Night Hero 
2009 – Tourist in Your Own Town (label: Capitol East Records)

Planet Funk 
2011 – The Great Shake (label: Universal Music)
2012 – The Great Shake + 2 (label: Universal Music)

Alex Uhlmann 
2017 – "The Ocean" (ft. Edo) (single, label: Sony Music)
2018 – "Butterfly" (single, label: Universal Music)
2021 – "Paris or Rome" (Single, Label: Hoernsenmusic)
2021 – "Never be the same" (Single, Label: Hoernsenmusic)
2022 – "Only For A Minute" (Single, Label: Hoernsenmusic)
2022 – "Only For A Minute (Sterio Remix)" (Single, Label: Hoernsenmusic)

Collaborations 
2012 Giuliano Sangiorgi: vocals on "Ora il mondo è perfetto" on the album The Great Shake
2012 Ivan Cotroneo: Director of the music video for "These Boots Are Made for Walkin'"
2017 Francis Davila: in "Anyway"
2018 – 2019 David Morales: in "Back Home" (single, label: Diridim) and "One Race" (single, label: Nervous Records)

External links 
 Official web site of Alex Uhlmann
 Official Instagramm of Alex Uhlmann
 Official web site of Planet Funk

References 

Rock guitarists
Luxembourgian male singer-songwriters
Lead guitarists
1981 births
Living people
21st-century guitarists
21st-century Luxembourgian male singers
German male singer-songwriters